Cardamom breads, including the Finnish  (or ) and Swedish  and , are a group of enriched breads or pastry flavored with cardamom. They are eaten throughout the year, typically with coffee or tea.

Cardamom is a spice used in several Nordic countries in cakes, cookies, and biscuits, including traditional Finnish Christmas pastries.

Pulla

 is a mildly-sweet Finnish sweet roll or dessert bread flavored with crushed cardamom seeds and occasionally raisins or sliced almonds. Braided loaves are formed from three or more strands of dough. The loaves may also be formed into a ring.  They are typically coated with egg wash and then sprinkled with white sugar or almonds. Other types of pulla include small round buns that resemble English scones but have a sugar and butter topping, and larger cinnamon rolls called . The outside typically has a shiny, brown glaze, formed by a coating of egg white, milk or a mixture of sugar and brewed coffee.

Usually pulla is baked as a small, round, brioche-style loaf, which is served whole, or as a long loaf called , which is sliced, and can be braided to make it more decorative and festive. Some variations are topping it with chopped walnuts and vanilla icing, raisins added to the dough, cinnamon rolls (called , sometimes topped with pearl sugar or almond flakes), butter and sugar buns called , berry toppings and curd filled buns called . For special occasions, saffron may be added to the dough to impart flavour and a yellow tint.

In Finland, pulla is often served with coffee. In cafeterias, the quality of the pulla is considered a sign of the establishment's overall quality.

Pulla is also common in the Upper Peninsula of Michigan and Northern Ontario, areas in the United States and Canada which have large Finnish populations. The term  refers instead to a biscotti-like, double-baked breadstick for dunking in coffee that is often made from leftover nisu.

In Sweden

Cardamom bread is considered a traditional food among Swedish Americans. Cardamom buns are eaten along with coffee or tea.

See also
Tsoureki
Challah
Bejgli

References

External links
Recipe

Swedish cuisine
Finnish cuisine
Braided egg breads
Sweet breads
Cuisine of the Midwestern United States